Paracaesio is a genus marine ray-finned fishes, snappers belonging to the family Lutjanidae. They are native to the Indian Ocean and the western Pacific Ocean, with these currently recognized species:
 Paracaesio brevidentata W. T. White & Last, 2012
 Paracaesio caerulea (Katayama, 1934) (Japanese snapper)
 Paracaesio gonzalesi Fourmanoir & Rivaton, 1979 (Vanuatu snapper)
 Paracaesio kusakarii T. Abe, 1960 (saddle-back snapper)
 Paracaesio paragrapsimodon W. D. Anderson & Kailola, 1992
 Paracaesio sordida T. Abe & S. Shinohara, 1962 (dirty ordure snapper)
 Paracaesio stonei U. Raj & Seeto, 1983 (cocoa snapper)
 Paracaesio waltervadi W. D. Anderson & Collette, 1992
 Paracaesio xanthura (Bleeker, 1869) (yellowtail blue snapper)

References

Apsilinae
Marine fish genera
Taxa named by Pieter Bleeker